Hackney South and Shoreditch is a constituency represented in the House of Commons of the UK Parliament since 2005 by Meg Hillier of Labour Co-op.

History
The seat was created in February 1974 from the former seat of Shoreditch and Finsbury.

Ronald Brown was elected in 1974 as a representative of the Labour Party but defected from the Opposition to join the fledgling Social Democratic Party (SDP) in 1981, at a time when Labour wished for Common Market withdrawal and the removal of keeping a nuclear deterrent during the Cold War.  Brown held the seat as an SDP member until 1983, when he was defeated by Labour Party candidate Brian Sedgemore. Sedgemore announced his retirement from parliament at the 2005 election; but on 26 April 2005, after Parliament had been dissolved and he was no longer the sitting MP, defected to the Liberal Democrats, the successors to the SDP, shortly before the week of the election. The Liberal Democrats were unable to capitalise on the defection, their candidate only gaining the second largest gain in votes of the candidates competing.

In the 2016 referendum to leave the European Union, the constituency voted remain by 77.9%. This was the ninth highest support for remain for a constituency. 
Election Record
All elections since the seat's creation have been won by the Labour candidate, including the incumbent, Meg Hillier, with substantial majorities, making it a Labour stronghold.  The 2015 result ranked the seat the 16th safest of the party's 232 seats (by majority percentage) and fifth safest in the capital.

Boundaries 

1974–1983: The London Borough of Hackney wards of Dalston, De Beauvoir, Haggerston, Moorfields, Queensbridge, Victoria, and Wenlock.

1983–2010: The London Borough of Hackney wards of Chatham, Dalston, De Beauvoir, Haggerston, Homerton, King's Park, Moorfields, Queensbridge, Victoria, Wenlock, Westdown, and Wick.

2010–present: The London Borough of Hackney wards of Chatham, De Beauvoir, Hackney Central, Haggerston, Hoxton, King's Park, Queensbridge, Victoria, and Wick (as well as a small section at the southern end of Lea Bridge ward).

The constituency covers the southern part of the London Borough of Hackney.

The constituency shares a boundary with eight others:
Walthamstow, Leyton & Wanstead, West Ham, Bethnal Green & Bow, Cities of London and Westminster, Islington South & Finsbury, Islington North, and its borough partner Hackney North & Stoke Newington.

Members of Parliament

Election results

Elections in the 2010s

Elections in the 2000s

Elections in the 1990s

Elections in the 1980s 

Both Brown and Roberts were official candidates of their respective local parties and both supported the Alliance between the Liberals and the SDP; however, Brown was given endorsement by both national parties.

Elections in the 1970s

See also 
 List of parliamentary constituencies in Hackney
 List of parliamentary constituencies in London

Notes

References

Sources 
 Election result, 2005 (BBC)
 Election results, 1997 – 2001 (BBC)
 Election results, 1997 – 2001  (Election Demon)
 Election results, 1983 – 1992  (Election Demon)
 Election results, 1992 – 2005 (Guardian)
 Election results, 1974 – 1979  (Keele University)

External links 
Politics Resources (Election results from 1922 onwards)
Electoral Calculus (Election results from 1955 onwards)

Parliamentary constituencies in London
Parliamentary constituencies in the London Borough of Hackney
Constituencies of the Parliament of the United Kingdom established in 1974
Shoreditch